Frederick Colin Maitland, 14th Earl of Lauderdale OBE DL (12 April 1868 – 14 September 1931) was a Scottish peer and landowner. Known by the courtesy title of Viscount Maitland before he inherited the earldom, he fought in the Second Boer War and later in the First World War.

Lauderdale was a Scottish representative peer, with a seat in the House of Lords, from 1929 until his death.

Life
The elder son of the 13th Earl of Lauderdale, by his first wife, Charlotte Sleigh, a daughter of Lieutenant-Colonel Sleigh of the 77th Foot, Maitland was commissioned into the Royal Scots Fusiliers in 1886, transferred to the 2nd Dragoons in 1887 and to the Scots Guards in 1894, from which he retired as a lieutenant. After the outbreak of the Second Boer War in late 1899, he volunteered for active service with the Imperial Yeomanry in South Africa and was appointed adjutant of the 20th battalion on 21 March 1900. He served in South Africa 1900–1901, when he was mentioned in despatches. After his return, he was Assistant Director of Auxiliary Forces on the Headquarters Staff from 1904 to 1908. He saw further active service in the European War of 1914–1918, in which he was wounded. He was appointed OBE in 1919 and succeeded his father in 1924, taking up residence at Thirlestane Castle near Lauder in Scotland.

In 1929 Lauderdale was elected a Representative Peer for Scotland.

In 1890, he married Gwendoline Lucy, a younger daughter of Judge Robert Vaughan-Williams of Bodlonfla, Flintshire, and they had one son, Ian, who succeeded his father in 1931. He was elected a member of the Royal Photographic Society in 1896 and widely exhibited his work and wrote about photography.

Honours
Member of the Honourable Corps of Gentlemen-at-Arms, 1903 
Ensign of the Royal Company of Archers

Notes

1868 births
1931 deaths
British Army personnel of World War I
Deputy Lieutenants of Berwickshire
Earls of Lauderdale
Officers of the Order of the British Empire
Scots Guards officers
City of London Yeomanry (Rough Riders) officers
Members of the Royal Company of Archers
Honourable Corps of Gentlemen at Arms